Sendaigawa Dam or Sendaigawa No.2 Dam is a dam in Kagoshima Prefecture, Japan, completed in 1964. The dam is a gravity dam, built for the purpose of generating hydroelectric power.

See also
List of dams in Japan

References

Dams in Kagoshima Prefecture
Dams completed in 1964